Cyperus seemannianus is a species of sedge that occurs on a number of islands in the South Pacific.

The species was first formally described by the botanist Johann Otto Boeckeler in 1870.

See also 
 List of Cyperus species

References 

seemannianus
Taxa named by Johann Otto Boeckeler
Plants described in 1870
Flora of Fiji
Flora of Tonga
Flora of Niue
Flora of Samoa
Flora of the Society Islands